Kentucky Flyer is a wooden roller coaster located at Kentucky Kingdom in Louisville, Kentucky. The coaster opened on April 28, 2019, to celebrate Kentucky Kingdom's 30th anniversary.

History
Teasing for a new attraction began on September 14, 2018, hinting at a new aviation themed ride as well as a September 21 announcement date. As planned, the Kentucky Flyer junior wooden coaster was announced on September 21, 2018, with a planned 2019 opening date.

Construction on Kentucky Flyer began soon after, but was quickly halted in mid-October by the park's landlord, the Kentucky State Fair Board, who stopped the park from preceding with any kind of work and payments done on the ride, placing the ride's future in jeopardy. In an October 16 press conference on the construction site, park CEO Ed Hart claimed that the Fair Board was withholding access in an attempt to strong-arm the park into dropping a lawsuit over breaking a paid parking lease, instead giving rented spots out to Kentucky State Fair vendors. The following day, after Governor Matt Bevin and his administration became involved, the Fair Board changed course and once again granted permission for the park to continue onwards, securing Kentucky Flyer's future.

In November 2018, Kentucky Flyer's plane-themed lead car was put on display at the IAAPA 2018 Expo in Orlando, Florida. Foundations would continue to be poured during that time, and the coaster structure would go vertical on November 30, 2018. Work would continue throughout the winter and be completed in late March/early April of 2019. On April 12, 2019, Kentucky Flyer reportedly began testing trains on the layout, and the coaster opened to the public later that month, on April 28.

Characteristics

Statistics
There are 12 airtime moments along the ride, and a maximum side banking of 54°. Designed by The Gravity Group, the coaster is what many refer to as a modern junior wooden coaster, as it is very suitable for children, and similar to rides like Roar-o-Saurus at Story Land and Wooden Warrior at Quassy Amusement Park.

The coaster structure is mainly made of painted steel, although the track and handrails are wooden, thus it can be classified as such. The support structure is painted white while the track has no paint, with red being applied to the handrails.

Kentucky Flyer operates with a pair of 12 passenger Timberliner trains, which have airplane-spoofing lead cars and curved lap bars, the latter of which make the ride suitable and comfortable for guests of all sizes. Timberliners are also far lighter trains than most and can navigate very tight curves.

Location
Kentucky Flyer is located behind the Hurricane Bay waterpark, running in the background of the 2014 Hurricane Bay expansion. The coaster's turnaround is located on one acre of expansion land promised to the park by the Fair Board. The entrance is located near the Skycatcher tower swing ride.

Ride experience
The ride twists into a pair of double ups before hitting the left-hand turnaround at a 54° banked angle. Several airtime hills are navigated on the way back before the train drops down into the final brake run. When allowed to do so, the train proceeds to make a right-hand hairpin turn back into the station.

References

External links
 Kentucky Flyer at Kentucky Kingdom

Kentucky Kingdom
Roller coasters in Kentucky
2019 establishments in Kentucky
Roller coasters manufactured by The Gravity Group